The 2001–02 New Zealand Figure Skating Championships was held at the Alpine Ice Sports Centre in Christchurch from 17 through 20 September 2001. Skaters competed in the disciplines of men's singles and ladies' singles across many levels, including senior, junior, novice, adult, and the pre-novice disciplines of juvenile, pre-primary, primary, and intermediate.

Senior results

Men

Ladies

External links
 2001–02 New Zealand Figure Skating Championships results

2001 in figure skating
New Zealand Figure Skating Championships
Figure Skating
September 2001 sports events in New Zealand